SS France was a French ocean liner that was shelled by  in the Mediterranean Sea  south west of Cape Teulada, Sardinia, Italy, while she was travelling from Mudros, Greece to Marseille, France.

Construction 
France was constructed in 1896 at the Forges & Chantiers shipyard in La Seyne, France. She was completed in 1897.
She had a Triple expansion steam engine driving a single screw propeller and the engine was rated at 474 nhp.

Accident Of 1906 
On 1 March 1906 France ran aground with 800 passengers on board at Ilha Bela, near Santos, Brazil, following a navigational error and fog. The passengers were picked up by the SS Poitou. She was refloated on 4 March 1906 and returned to service later that year.

Sinking 
On 7 November 1915, France was on a voyage from Mudros, Greece, to Marseille, France,  when she was shelled by the German submarine  in the Mediterranean Sea near the coast of Sardinia. After numerous explosions and fires, the crew and passengers abandoned the ship and she sank a few hours later. There were no casualties.

References

Steamships of France
1896 ships
Ships built in France
Maritime incidents in 1915
Ships sunk with no fatalities
Ships sunk by German submarines in World War I
World War I shipwrecks in the Mediterranean Sea
Ocean liners